The Diocese of Hanuato'o is one of the nine current dioceses of the Anglican Church of Melanesia; it was erected in 1991 and inaugurated at St George's Church, Kirakira on St Peter's Day, 29 June 1991. That church is now her cathedral, rededicated as St Peter's Cathedral; the diocese is divided into fifteen parishes.

List of bishops

References

Sources
Anglican Church of Melanesia — Diocese of Hanuato'o

 
Hanuato'o, Diocese of
Melanesia
 
Christian organizations established in 1991
1991 establishments in Oceania